Mrvan is a surname. Notable people with the surname include:

 Frank Ed Mrvan Jr. (born 1933), American politician
 Frank J. Mrvan (born 1969), American politician